Makhmadjon Khabibulloev (born May 8, 1965, Tajikistan) is Tajikistani football coach.

Coaching career
As the most successful coach from Tajikistan, he won the Tajik League six with Regar-TadAZ Tursunzoda in 2001, 2002, 2004, 2006, 2007 and 2008. He won the Tajik Cup on five occasions Ravshan Kulob in 1994, and Regar-TadAZ Tursunzoda in 2001, 2002, 2005, 2006.

At the start of the 2015 season, Khabibulloev was appointed as manager of Ravshan Kulob, but in July 2015 resigned.

Managerial Statistics

Notes:

Honours

Club
Ravshan Kulob
Tajik Cup (1): 1994

Regar-TadAZ
Tajik League (6): 2001, 2002, 2003, 2004, 2006, 2007, 2008
Tajik Cup (3): 2001, 2005, 2006
AFC President's Cup (3): 2005, 2008, 2009

Personal
Merited Coach of the Republic of Tajikistan
Best Coach of Tajikistan (2006, 2008)

References

External links

Living people
1965 births
Tajikistani football managers
Tajikistan national football team managers
Soviet footballers
Tajikistani footballers
Association football midfielders